Academic Magnet High School (AMHS) is a high school (grades 912) in North Charleston, South Carolina, United States. The school enrolls students through an admissions process based on middle school grades, test scores, teacher recommendations, and a written essay.

History
Academic Magnet High School was established in 1988, and the first class graduated in 1992. The school was originally located as a separate sub-campus of Burke High School in downtown Charleston. It then moved to the Charleston Naval Base, where it stayed until 2010, when it moved to the newly built Bonds Wilson campus on the site of the old Bonds-Wilson High School in North Charleston, South Carolina. Academic Magnet shares a campus with the Charleston County School of the Arts middle and high schools. The new campus is part of an effort by the Charleston County School District to upgrade its facilities. In December 2018, the school changed its motto from "seriously smart" to "eruditio et honor" (scholarship and honor) due to a movement led by a student council member.

Students

The school's SAT scores were the second-best in the state for the 2003–2004 year, surpassed only by the South Carolina Governor's School for Science and Mathematics.

Academic Magnet is composed of students who reside in Charleston County and of students who own property in Charleston County. The school is located in Charleston County School District 4.

Curriculum
To graduate, students are required to fulfill a 120-hour service requirement, take (and pass) at least four Advanced Placement (AP) courses throughout their high school career, and complete AP Research and AP Seminar, as a replacement to the formerly used senior thesis.

Recognition

In the May 19, 2008 Newsweek cover story, Academic Magnet High School was ranked 7th among national public high schools based on an index consisting of the quotient of AP exams taken by all students and the quantity and quality of graduating seniors. In 2013, it was recognized by U.S. News & World Report as the 7th best high school in the nation.

In April 2019, U.S. News & World Report recognized Academic Magnet High School as the best high school in the nation. The school was ranked number one among more than 17,000 public high schools. In April 2020, April 2021, and April 2022, U.S. News & World Report recognized Academic Magnet High School as the second best high school in the nation.

Faculty
Judith Peterson served as principal from the school’s founding until the end of the academic year in July 2003. Carol Tempel served as principal from July 2003 to July 2004 with Peterson returning after Tempel's departure.  Peterson was succeeded by Catherine Spencer who was principal from July 2017 to June 2021. The current principal is Jacob Perlmutter who is an alumnus of Academic Magnet.

Notable alumni 
Muhiyidin Moye, Black Lives Matter activist
Spencer Wetmore, state legislator

Sports

The school has won 18 SCHSL state championships, including five championships in the 201314 school year alone. The football team achieved its first ever winning record (65) in the 2012 season. In October 2013, the Raptors' men's swim team became the first sports team from AMHS to win back-to-back SCHSL state titles, a feat later outdone by the women's soccer team in 201315. In addition to team success, AMHS has had individual state champions in men's and women's cross country and track, men's and women's swimming, and wrestling, and has sent many student-athletes on to compete at the collegiate level.

Baseball (men's varsity & JV): 201617 National Champions
Cross country (men's): 2006, 2007, 2008 A State runners-up, 2012 AA State runners-up, 2013 AA State Champions
Football: 2012 first-ever winning record (6-5)
Golf (men's): 2010 A State Champions
Sailing: 2011, 2013, 2014 State Champions, 2012 State runners-up
Soccer (men's): 2008, 2009, 2010 A State runners-up, 2012, 2014 AA State Champions
Soccer (women's): 2011, 2013, 2014 AA State Champions, 2012 AA State runners-up
Swimming (men's): 2004, 2010, 2011, 2014, 2015 AAA-AA-A State runners-up, 2012, 2013 AAA-AA-A State Champions
Swimming (women's): 2013 AAA-AA-A State runners-up 2014 AAA-AA-A State runners-up, 2015 AAA-AA-A State Champions 2016 AAA-AA-A State Champions
Tennis (men's): 2016 AA State Champions

State Champion teams 
Cross country (men's): 2013
Cross country (women's): 2014
Golf (men's): 2010
Sailing: 2011, 2013, 2014
Soccer (men's): 2012, 2014, 2015, 2017, 2018
Soccer (women's): 2011, 2013, 2014, 2015, 2017, 2018
Swimming (men's): 2012, 2013
Swimming (women's): 2015, 2016
Tennis (men's): 2016

References

External links
School profile
AMHS homepage

Public high schools in South Carolina
Magnet schools in South Carolina
Education in North Charleston, South Carolina
Schools in Charleston County, South Carolina
1988 establishments in North Carolina
Educational institutions established in 1988